The women's 57 kg judo competitions at the 2022 Commonwealth Games in Birmingham, England took place on August 1st at the Coventry Arena. A total of ten competitors from nine nations took part.

Former World Champion Christa Deguchi of Canada, competing in her first major multi-sport event won the gold medal, defeating Acelya Toprak of England in the gold medal match.

Results
The draw is as follows:

Repechages

References

External link
 
 Results
 

W57
2022
Commonwealth W57